James Joseph Ryan (born May 18, 1957) is a former Linebackers coach and former National Football League linebacker for the Denver Broncos.

External links
Denver Broncos bio page

1957 births
Living people
Sportspeople from Camden, New Jersey
American football linebackers
William & Mary Tribe football players
Denver Broncos players
Denver Broncos coaches
Houston Texans coaches
Players of American football from Camden, New Jersey